Stefan Kiedrzyński (1888–1943) was a Polish writer and essayist. He has published several novels and screenplays, mainly comedies.

External links

1888 births
1943 deaths
20th-century Polish male writers
20th-century Polish novelists
Polish male novelists
Polish essayists
20th-century essayists
20th-century Polish screenwriters
Male screenwriters